Oleksandr Savenchuk (born 1 January 1963) is a retired Soviet football player and Ukrainian coach. He spend most of his career to Desna Chernihiv the main club in Chernihiv.

Career
He started his career in Desna Chernihiv from 1992 until 1994, where he played 35 matches and scored 5 goals. In 1993 he moved for one season in Torpedo Zaporizhzhia, where he played 4 games.

In 2018 he played in a tournament with the Veteran of Desna Chernihiv, where he scored a goal in the match Desna against "Veteran-Luchesk 4:2.

References

External links 
Profile on website 

1963 births
Soviet footballers
FC Desna Chernihiv players
FC Dnipro players
FC Sokil Zolochiv players
FC Slavia Mozyr players
FC Torpedo Zaporizhzhia players
Ukrainian expatriate footballers
Expatriate footballers in Belarus
Ukrainian Premier League managers
Living people
Association football forwards